Aleksandra Vukajlović (born 7 June 1997) is a Serbian handball player for Debreceni VSC and the Serbian national team.

References 

Living people
1997 births
Serbian female handball players
Sportspeople from Čačak
Expatriate handball players
Serbian expatriate sportspeople in Hungary
Békéscsabai Előre NKSE players
Competitors at the 2018 Mediterranean Games
Competitors at the 2022 Mediterranean Games
Mediterranean Games bronze medalists for Serbia
Mediterranean Games medalists in handball